"Make It Like It Was" is a 1990 R&B/Soul song by American singer–songwriter Regina Belle. Released on March 17, 1990 by Columbia Records, The song was written by Carvin Winans. This single was released from Belle's 1989 album, Stay with Me.  It spent one week at number one on the R&B singles chart and peaked at number forty-three on the Billboard Hot 100 singles chart.  On the Adult Contemporary chart, "Make It Like It Was" went to number five.

Chart positions

Official versions
Album version (5:07)
Radio edit (4:04)

See also
 R&B number-one hits of 1990 (USA)

References

1990 singles
1990 songs
1989 songs
Contemporary R&B ballads
Soul ballads
Regina Belle songs
1980s ballads